This is a list of cluster bombs as of 2008.

Brazil
BLG-120
BLG-204
BLG-252

France 
 BAP 100

Germany 
AB 23
AB 250-2
AB 70-D1
BDC 10

Israel
TAL 1
TAL 2

Poland
ZK-300
LBKas-250

South Africa
 CB-470 Cluster Bomb dispenser
 Alpha Bomb

Soviet Union
RRAB-3
RBK-250
RBK-500
RBK-750

United Kingdom
JP233
BL755

United States
CBU-2
CBU-3
CBU-7
CBU-12
CBU-14
CBU-22
CBU-24
CBU-25
CBU-28
CBU-29
CBU-30
CBU-33
CBU-34
CBU-38
CBU-42 (Paired with CBU-34)   
CBU-46
CBU-49
CBU-52
CBU-54
CBU-55
CBU-58
CBU-59
CBU-60
CBU-63
CBU-70
CBU-71
CBU-71A/B
CBU-72
CBU-75 Sadeye
CBU-76
CBU-77
CBU-78 Gator 
CBU-81
CBU-87 CEM 
CBU-89 Gator  
CBU-94
CBU-97 SFW 
CBU-98
CBU-98/B (DAACM)
CBU-99
CBU-100
CBU-105
CBU-107
MK15
MK20 Rockeye
MK22
M29

References

External links
Global Security

 List of cluster bombs